Renato Dirnei Florêncio Santos (born 15 May 1979), known simply as Renato, is a Brazilian former professional footballer.

A central midfielder with good heading ability in spite of a small frame, he played most of his professional career in Spain with Sevilla, appearing in 286 official games with the club (39 goals scored).

A Brazilian international during two years, Renato was part of the squads that won one Copa América and one Confederations Cup.

Club career

Guarani
Renato was born in Santa Mercedes, São Paulo. Known as Renatinho during his beginnings, he was a Guarani Futebol Clube youth graduate, and made his senior debut on 17 April 1996 when he started in a 0–1 Campeonato Paulista home loss against São Paulo FC. He scored his first professional goal on 6 September 1998, netting the first in a 2–0 home win over Sport Club Internacional.

Santos
In June 2000, Renato moved to fellow top level club Santos FC for a R$2 million fee. He made his competitive debut on 2 August, starting in a 2–0 home success over Esporte Clube Vitória.

Renato scored his first goal for the Fish on 7 February 2001, netting the first in a 3–0 home win against CR Vasco da Gama for the Torneio Rio–São Paulo championship. He added a further five during the campaign, being a regular starter.

In 2003, Renato scored a career-best nine goals in the year's Brasileirão, and was also an ever-present figure for the team in their Copa Libertadores run.

Sevilla

On 7 July 2004, Renato signed a five-year contract with Sevilla FC from Spain, aged 25. Alongside compatriots Adriano and Daniel Alves, as well as several club youth graduates, he would play an essential part in the Andalusians' La Liga consolidation, making his competition debut on 29 August: after just one minute on the pitch, in the start of the second half of the home fixture against Albacete Balompié, he scored the game's only goal.

From 2005 to 2007, Renato played 16 UEFA Cup games in both seasons combined, as Sevilla won the tournament twice in a row. His only goal was a decisive one, as he scored in the 2–0 home win against CA Osasuna in the second leg of the semi-finals of the 2006–07 edition (2–1 on aggregate); he was also utilized in both finals.

In the 2008–09 season, Renato netted eight times in 32 matches to help the side finish in third position. Four of those came from December 2008 to January 2009, against Real Madrid (4–3 win, away), Villarreal CF (1–0, at home), Deportivo de La Coruña (3–1 triumph, away) and CD Numancia (1–0, at home).

On 4 October 2009, Renato scored through a header in a 2–1 home win against Real Madrid. He contributed with 33 games and four goals to Sevilla's fourth-place finish, with the subsequent qualification to the UEFA Champions League; at the end of the campaign he extended his link to the club for a further year, until June 2012.

Botafogo
On 26 May 2011, Renato cut ties with Sevilla by mutual agreement and signed a three-year contract with Botafogo de Futebol e Regatas. He was a regular starter during his first two years at the club, forming a strong midfield unit alongside internationals Nicolás Lodeiro and Clarence Seedorf, but later served as a backup to Gabriel; he was also marred by injuries during the 2013 season.

Santos return

On 13 May 2014, Renato left Botafogo and returned to Santos, signing a deal until the end of the campaign. He was named among the substitutes two days later, but remained unused during the 4–2 home win against Princesa do Solimões Esporte Clube.

After struggling with injuries, Renato was mainly used as a backup to Arouca and Alison, playing as a defensive midfielder. On 13 January 2015, despite appearing in only 14 matches after his return, he renewed his contract for a further year.

On 1 March 2015, Renato scored his first goal after his return, netting his team's second in a 4–2 home win over Clube Atlético Linense. He was a regular starter during the season, partnering Thiago Maia and contributing with 53 appearances and two goals.

On 13 April 2016, aged already 36, Renato agreed to an extension with Santos until the end of 2017. The following 27 January, after being an ever-present figure during the year, he renewed his contract until December 2018.

On 18 September 2018, Renato was announced the new director of football of Santos in immediate effect, whilst acting also as a player until the expiration of his contract. He announced his retirement on 24 November, and played his last match hours later, after replacing goalscorer Gabriel late into a 3–2 home win against Atlético Mineiro; he represented the club in 425 matches, scoring 33 goals and winning four titles.

International career
Renato made his debut for Brazil in 2003, being picked for the squads at the 2004 Copa América and the 2005 FIFA Confederations Cup: in the former he played all six matches – all minutes – and made five substitute appearances in the latter, with the national side winning both competitions.

Career statistics

Club
Source:

International

Honours

Club
Santos
Campeonato Brasileiro Série A: 2002, 2004
Campeonato Paulista: 2015, 2016
Copa do Brasil: Runner-up 2015

Sevilla
Copa del Rey: 2006–07, 2009–10
Supercopa de España: 2007
UEFA Cup: 2005–06, 2006–07
UEFA Super Cup: 2006

Botafogo
Campeonato Carioca: 2013

International
Brazil
Copa América: 2004
FIFA Confederations Cup: 2005

Individual
Bola de Prata: 2003

References

External links

1979 births
Living people
Footballers from São Paulo (state)
Brazilian footballers
Association football midfielders
Campeonato Brasileiro Série A players
Guarani FC players
Santos FC players
Botafogo de Futebol e Regatas players
La Liga players
Sevilla FC players
UEFA Cup winning players
Brazil international footballers
2004 Copa América players
2005 FIFA Confederations Cup players
Copa América-winning players
FIFA Confederations Cup-winning players
Santos FC non-playing staff
Brazilian expatriate footballers
Expatriate footballers in Spain
Brazilian expatriate sportspeople in Spain